Burger Bowl is an athletic field on the West Campus of the Georgia Institute of Technology, at the intersection of Hemphill Avenue and Ferst Street. It is located behind the Fitten, Freeman, and Montag dorms. The bowl itself is split in two by a sidewalk creating the larger Burger Bowl, adjacent to the SAC fields, and the smaller Taco Bowl, adjacent to Hemphill Avenue.

The Burger Bowl was known for its characteristic lack of grass, the prevailing contents of the soil being a mixture of dirt, rocks, and urban debris. The elevated lips that give the green space its bowl-shape lead to the flooding in the field, puddles from heavy rains sometimes leaving the field in a marshy state. In 2010, the bowl was renovated and leveled, and new sod was laid down.

Since then, the Burger bowl has been a fertile , grass-filled landscape for students to gather, play and relax on.

History
The bowl-shaped field picked up the "Burger" name during the 1970s, when Burger King opened a restaurant across Hemphill Avenue from the field. The Burger King, which closed in the mid-1980s, was next to the site of former Georgia Governor Lester Maddox's Pickrick Cafeteria.

The Burger Bowl was used as a practice area for field events for the 1996 Olympic Games.  Following the Olympics, the Atlanta Commission for the Olympic Games (ACOG) had 6 inches of sand placed over the field, and grass sowed in it.  This slightly improved drainage of the field, but did nothing to improve grass cover, given the wear and tear it faced as a rugby practice field.

Uses
The field is currently a recreational field for a variety of intramural athletics, and home to the Georgia Tech Rugby Football Club (a rugby union team). The Bowl also serves as a meeting place for clubs and events, including most Georgia Tech Homecoming and Greek Week events. The field is on a slight grade, so ends of the field are often referred to as uphill or downhill for location purposes. 

Georgia Tech built the Leadership Challenge Course in the northeast corner.

References

External links
Map: 

Georgia Tech buildings and structures
Sports venues in Atlanta